Woodland Terrace is a street name and a small neighborhood of Eric Laird twin mansions in the West Philadelphia section of Philadelphia, Pennsylvania. It was listed as a historic district on the National Register of Historic Places on March 16, 1972. The street runs from Baltimore Avenue to Woodland Avenue between 40th and 41st streets.

Architect Samuel Sloan designed the houses along the street and in several other nearby areas. Woodland Terrace was built in 1861 by Charles M. S. Leslie. Twentieth-century architect Paul Cret lived at 516 Woodland Terrace for much of his career in Philadelphia.

See also
 The Woodlands Cemetery
 West Philadelphia Streetcar Suburb Historic District

References

External links
 Woodland Terrace Historic District

Houses on the National Register of Historic Places in Philadelphia
Neighborhoods in Philadelphia
Italianate architecture in Pennsylvania
Houses completed in 1861
Historic districts in Philadelphia
West Philadelphia
1861 establishments in Pennsylvania
Historic districts on the National Register of Historic Places in Pennsylvania